Lesman is a surname. Notable people with the surname include:

Bolesław Lesman, birth name of Bolesław Leśmian (1877–1937), Polish Jewish poet and artist
Jan Wiktor Lesman, birth name of Jan Brzechwa (1898–1966), Polish Jewish poet, author, and lawyer
Germán Lesman, Argentinian footballer

See also
Lessmann